The Lamentation over the Dead Christ, is a painting of the common subject of the Lamentation of Christ by the Italian Renaissance master Sandro Botticelli, finished around 1490–1492. It is now in the Alte Pinakothek, in Munich.

The portrait shows the inert body of Christ surrounded by the Virgin, St. Peter, and Mary Magdalene, St. John the Evangelist, St. Jerome and St. Paul.

The pathetic expressions of the characters were a novelty in Botticelli's art: under the spiritual influence of Savonarola's preachings in Florence, which began around the time the work was executed, he started in fact to abandon the allegoric inspiration that had made him a favourite of the Medici court in favour of more intimate and painstaking religious reflection.

See also
 Lamentation over the Dead Christ in Milan.

References

External links
Page at artonline.it 

1490s paintings
Collection of the Alte Pinakothek
Botticelli
Paintings of the Virgin Mary
Paintings by Sandro Botticelli
Paintings about death
Christian art about death
Paintings depicting Mary Magdalene
Paintings depicting Saint Peter